Karl Folke Frölén (25 February 1908 – 6 November 2002) was a Swedish horse rider who competed in the 1952 Summer Olympics. He and his horse Fair finished 15th in the individual eventing competition and won a gold medal with the Swedish eventing team.

References

1908 births
2002 deaths
Swedish event riders
Olympic equestrians of Sweden
Swedish male equestrians
Equestrians at the 1952 Summer Olympics
Olympic gold medalists for Sweden
Olympic medalists in equestrian
Medalists at the 1952 Summer Olympics
People from Eskilstuna
Sportspeople from Södermanland County